The Alamo Plaza Historic District is an historic district of downtown San Antonio in the U.S. state of Texas. It was listed on the National Register of Historic Places in 1977. It includes the Alamo, which is a separately listed Registered Historic Place and a U.S. National Historic Landmark.

In the early eighteenth century, when, upon arrival of Spanish Catholics, local Native Americans asked the Franciscan missionaries for permanent shelter and protection from rival tribes, they were provided shelter within the missions in exchange for conversion to Christianity. They were also given Spanish names.

Alamo Plaza's layout and landscaping were designed and supervised by city alderman Anton Wulff during the late 19th century. In recognition of his work on behalf of the area, local business leaders presented him with a gold-topped walking stick, engraved with words of appreciation.

The district originally included 27 buildings or structures:

Menger Hotel, 204 Alamo Plaza. "Built in 1857 the Menger was originally a two-story limestone building designed by John Fries.  Located at the southwest corner of the block the building  later expanded to a three-story building at this  corner.  Alfred Giles is responsible for this  later design.  The west façade of the original  building is now a three-story, three -bay structure.  The slightly  projecting central bay is crowned by a pedimented parapet.  The first  floor contains a central  door flanked by two windows, while the second and third  floors each contain three round  arched  openings.  The  end bays contain two flat  arched windows on each floor and these pavilions are capped by a bracketed  cornice. Iron balconies  extend at the second and third  floor  levels.  Additions to the north and east have been made several  times in the 19th and 20th centuries and the hotel now fills  the entire block. A lavish three-story space in the Menger lobby, illuminated by a stained glass, leaded  skylight, dominates the old part of the hotel.  The solid  block of hotel buildings is broken in the center by an interior courtyard of walkways through dense tropical foliage."
Dullnig  Building (1883), 101-103 North Alamo, a three-story Italianate-style brick building built for George Dullnig to serve as a grocery and dry goods store.  A ten-foot false façade tops the building, where a cornice once was.
Scholz  Palm  Garden (before 1891), 105-109 North Alamo, two-story brick building
Crockett Hotel (1909), E. Crockett St., originally a six-story building, with a seventh story added in 1927.  Overlooks The Alamo. property. Owned by corporation which also owns 1859 Menger Hotel, just across E. Crockett St., also overlooking The Alamo. 
Vance  Building (after 1930), 207-209 Alamo Plaza, a two-story brick building rebuilt after a fire in the 1920s or 1930s.

Old Joske's Building (1888 or later), 111-115 North Alamo, originally a two-story, six-bay brick commercial building, designed in 1888 by   James Wahrenberger.  Its main façade was plastered over in the 1900s.
Dreiss, Thompson and Company Building (1872), 117 North Alamo, a two-story, three-bay Victorian commercial building, built to serve as Adolph Dreiss's drugstore.  While main façade on Alamo Plaza had been covered, and the first floor had been altered, the Broadway side of building was unaltered. The second floor (on which side? check Google Streetview) "contains three segmental arched  windows separated by brick pilasters. A brick corbelled cornice is crowned by an arched parapet of pressed tin containing the company's name. The two  adjacent  buildings at 119-121 North Alamo are compatible in scale but their façades have been altered."

BEING ADAPTED, IN PROGRESS, FROM STARTING AS A LONG QUOTE
211-215 North Alamo These three, two-story brick commercial buildings were probably  built in the late 19th century.  They have been plastered over on the main façade.
Reuter Building, 217-219 North Alamo The Reuter Building is a four-story rectangular building with an angled corner on the main facade, which contained the original  entrance.  The first (1891) two floors on both the Alamo and Crockett façades have been  covered  with a false front.  The narrow façade facing Alamo street contains elaborate classical  detail.  The third  floor windows are the most elaborate with a blind balustrade and a complete entablature above each.  The windows on the fourth floor contain transoms.  Divided into bays by pilasters, this east façade is crowned by a massive stone and metal  cornice.  Along the north (Crockett) façade the arches of the second floor windows are visible above the false  front.  The  covered  third and fourth  floor windows have a flat  lintel  topped by a segmental arch.
Old Chamber of Commerce Building, Southeast corner Broadway and Crockett. This building is a two-story brick early 20th century commercial building with decorative cast concrete  vertical  members separating the windows on the second floor.  Erected in 1919-21, this  structure was occupied  by the Chamber of Commerce until 1925.
H. L. Green's Department Store, 301-305 Alamo Plaza A two-story, nondescript  limestone building. Green's was erected in the 1950s.  This was formerly the site of the 1886 Grand Opera House, which was destroyed by fire  after World War II.  The lavish Opera House was a theatre which seated 1500 and an exclusive men's club, the San Antonio Club, kept rooms in the building.
307 Alamo Plaza A three-story masonry building, this  vacant  structure was probably  built in the 1950s, replacing the Old Mexican Consulate.
309-315 Alamo Plaza A series  of one-story buildings.  Although the main façades are modern, the  structures  are  possibly  the same buildings  which are  visible in early photographs of  the Plaza.
Crockett Block, 317-323 Alamo Plaza Designed  by Alfred Giles,  this row  of  four limestone buildings  were erected in  1882  for William  and  Albert Maverick.  The  three-story  buildings  are  joined  visually by  a pressed tin cornice,  but  the  façades of  the  two  center  buildings  have been covered  by  a false front.  Although they have been altered on  the  first  floor,  the  two  outside buildings  retain their original arched openings on  the  second and  third  floors.  Pilasters  accentuate the  corners of  the  original  façades.
Woolworth's Department Store, 518  East Houston Woolworth's was a three-story  brick building erected in the 1920s to replace the  old Maverick Bank Building.  Divided into six wide bays on  the Alamo Plaza façade the  second and  third  floors utilized  fenestration  typical of  the  Commercial Style.  Each unit contained a broad central  light of plate glass, fixed,  and  narrow side lights with  an  opening sash. Each of these lights contained  a transom.  A frieze and  slightly  projecting  cornice terminated  the  building.  This early  20th century commercial building replaced  an  elaborate  1886  Victorian  structure, designed  by Alfred Giles.   The  bank was  the  first  five-story building  in the city  and  contained continuous balconies on all four  levels.
Moore Building, Northeast corner of Houston and  Broadway  The  Moore building  is a six-story brick building stuccoed  and  scored to look like stone. Constructed in 1904,  the  building  is basically rectangular with an angled southwest corner to mark the main entrance. Scoring accentuates the  angled corner as  well  as  the  two  flanking bays at  the second, third  and  fourth levels. A small cornice elaborated  by  terra-cotta swag  and  cartouche motifs  marks the  fifth  floor, while a dentilled cornice emphasizes the 6th  floor. Terra-cotta details further embellish  the  divisions between the paired windows on the  5th and 6th  floors. Crowning the  structure  is a projecting pressed tin  cornice. The  building originally had a roof garden above the  fifth  floor with  pavilions at four corners. An alley off Houston provided access to the  elevator. In 1909, the addition of the  sixth floor replaced  the  roof garden and expansion to the east closed the Houston Street  entrance.
Gibbs Building, 521 East Houston An eight-story  brick building, the Gibbs buildings, was constructed in 1912. The  first  two stories are scored and are  divided  from the  shaft of the  building  by a bracketed cornice at the  third  floor level.  The third  through  the seventh floors  contain  little  ornamentation, but  the  top floor is articulated by a string-course and elaborate sculptural  detail between the windows.  Terminating the building is a bracketed cornice with  modillions  and dentils. The  remainder of the  buildings  along Houston between Alamo Plaza and Broadway, as well as the  buildings  along Broadway behind  the 300 block of Alamo Plaza, are not significant architecturally or historically,  but  they are  compatible in scale and use.
Post Office and Federal Building (San Antonio, Texas), 615 East Houston. The building was designed by Ralph Cameron and built  in 1937 by the Works Progress Administration. The  ground floor is rusticated and contains the entrances, but  the dominant feature of the main (south) façade is the  classical colonnade in antis on the second and third  floor. A cornice divides  this level from the  final  story. The  Postal Service first moved to Alamo Plaza in 1877 on the northwest corner of the present Joske's block. In 1886,  J. Riely Gordon supervised construction of a Romanesque Revival building at this location. The present building replaced the 1886  Post Office.
Old Medical Arts Building (Landmark Building) (1926), 705 East Houston. A 13-story, steel  framed, triangular building designed by Ralph Cameron, the old Medical Arts Building was constructed in 1926. The building contains two wings which form a triangular shape and,  rising above the  angled corner entrance at Houston and Avenue E, is a three-story,  hexagonal tower. The first two floors are  faced with  stone and contain  widearched window spaces. The upper portion of  the building is brick with  terra cotta  detailing. Elements of both the Gothic and Renaissance styles are evident in the detailing. Gothic features  pre-dominate in the  pointed arched openings of the  first  two floors and in the upper two  floors of the  tower. Below the dormers, however, the  twelfth floor contains a series of round arched windows. The building has recently  been purchased and renamed the Landmark Building.
San Antonio Turn Verein. The Turn Verein is a two-story brick building constructed in 1891 and designed by James Wahrenberger. The building is made of Chicago pressed brick relieved  by stringcourses, lintels and balustrades of Kerrville limestone. A three-part composition of a recessed bay and projecting ends defines the east (main) façade. Within  the wide central  bay a slightly  projecting main entrance is off center and is  defined by a rusticated  stone arch. The remainder of the  first  floor openings have stilted  arches with a keystone and rusticated voussoirs. On the second floor above the main entrance are  polished  granite  pilasters that frame a window with a pedimented entablature  and square transom. The remaining windows have round arched windows supported by small  granite  columns, and are  surmounted with a corbel  table. The  rectangular building  displays  a two-story bay window on the south façade. A metal, hipped roof  shelters  the  building. The  building was restored  in 1972 by the U.S. Postal Service employees. The  floor is of alternating oak and black walnut stripes. The staircase  hall at the back of the building  is illuminated  through stained  glass windows. Covering the staircase  landing  is a hardwood parquette floor laid  in a bright pattern of contrasting  colors. The ballroom on the  second floor and the gymnasium in the basement have not  been  restored.
Cenotaph (1940), North end of the Plaza.  [The cenotaph is a] memorial to the Alamo defenders stands in Alamo Plaza about 200 feet from the Alamo chapel. Dedicated  in 1940 the  design was conceived by Adams and Adams, architects and the  sculptured  figures were done by the  internationally famed Pompeo Coppini. The sixty-foot monument has a white marble shaft  atop a 40x12 foot granite base. The names of the Alamo heroes and  two memorial sentences are inscribed  on the base. The Cenotaph was commissioned by the  state of Texas as a Texas Centennial project.
Bandstand, South end of the Plaza A recently constructed bandstand by the city which replaces  the original bandstand built in the plaza by Wm.  Reuter in 1890.  The city is also currently covering the entire plaza with paving blocks.
The Alamo. This block contains the Alamo chapel building which has been restored and houses a museum.  Several  other buildings were erected in 1936 and a part of the old wall was reconstructed.  The remainder of the block is covered  by formally landscaped gardens and reveals part of the old acequia system, (see National Register submission. The Alamo, Bexar County, a ).
Lady Bird Johnson Fountain  This fountain honoring  Mrs. Lyndon B. Johnson (Lady Bird Johnson?) was dedicated in 1974.
Crockett Hotel, 201 East Crockett The  Crockett Hotel was originally a six-story brick building, but a remodeling in 1927  added the seventh-story.  A cornice with wide modillioned eaves surmounts the original  six floors.  Built  in 1909 the hotel was designed  by Padgett.  The west façade is broken into two planes  following the configuration of the block and the corner entrance at Bonham and Crockett is rounded.
Joske's Department Store, Commerce at Alamo Encompassing almost the entire south block of the plaza is Joske's Department Store, a four-story, U-shaped concrete structure with a stylized  parapet.  The present structure incorporates the 1888 brick building, designed by Alfred Giles, that stood at  the southeast corner of the block. Joske's shared  the north side of the block with the old 1877 Post Office, but in the 1950s Joske's expanded and remodeled, building on the entire block, except for the property of St. Joseph's Church.
St. Joseph's Church and Rectory, 623 East Commerce. Designed by G. Friesleben and Theodore Giraud, St. Joseph's Church was erected between 1868 and 1876.  The limestone structure is a Gothic Revival, basilican plan church, dominated  by a central  entrance tower with a slate and copper roof. The  third  paster of the church. Father Henry Pefferkorm, painted the Stations of the Cross which  hang at the sides of the church and the Assumption of Mary and Ascension of Christ that hang at the front.  He also designed  the first  altar  and choir loft,  replaced the canvas windows with glass, and installed a pipe organ. In  1898, Jacob Wa
END OF SECTION IN PROCESS OF BEING EDITED FROM QUOTE

In 2019, Alamo Architects firm has designed, for the San Antonio Conservation Society, an Alamo Museum expansion area design utilizing the Woolworth building, the Crockett Block building, and the post office building, "that will interpret the history of the 1836 battle. This concept preserves the Woolworth Building as a visible link to San Antonio’s civil rights history."

See also
 Medical Arts Building (San Antonio)
 Menger Hotel
 Main and Military Plazas Historic District, in San Antonio
 National Register of Historic Places listings in Bexar County, Texas

References

External links
 More pictures related to early and modern-day San Antonio, Texas, at University of Houston Digital Library

National Register of Historic Places in San Antonio
Historic districts on the National Register of Historic Places in Texas
Transportation in Bexar County, Texas